The 1951–52 IHL season was the seventh season of the International Hockey League, a North American minor professional league. Five teams participated in the regular season, and the Toledo Mercurys won the Turner Cup.

Regular season

Turner Cup-Playoffs

External links
 Season 1951/52 on hockeydb.com 

IHL
IHL
International Hockey League (1945–2001) seasons